Stefan Skrbo (born 23 January 2001) is an Austrian professional footballer who plays as a winger for Tirol.

Career
Skrbo is a product of the youth academies of Jenbach, Schwaz, AKA Tirol, DFI Bad Aibling and Tirol. He began his senior career with the reserves of Tirol in 2018. He was promoted to their senior team on 23 June 2021. He made his professional debut with Tirol in a 3–1 Austrian Football Bundesliga loss to FC Red Bull Salzburg on 11 September 2021.

International career
Skrbo is a youth international for Austria, having represented the Austria U21s once in November 2021.

References

External links
 
 OEFB Profile

2001 births
Living people
Austrian footballers
Austria under-21 international footballers
WSG Tirol players
Austrian Football Bundesliga players
Austrian Regionalliga players
Association football wingers
Austrian people of Serbian descent
Austrian people of Bosnia and Herzegovina descent
Austrian expatriate footballers
Austrian expatriate sportspeople in Germany
Expatriate footballers in Germany